Tina Punzel (born 1 August 1995) is a German diver.

Career
Punzel competed at the 2015 World Aquatics Championships.

At the 2016 Summer Olympics, she competed in the women's 3 metre springboard event. She finished 17th in the semifinal and did not qualify for the final.  She also competed in the women's synchronized 3 metre springboard event with teammate Nora Subschinski. They finished in seventh place.

See also
Germany at the 2015 World Aquatics Championships

References

External links

 
 
 
 www.iat.uni-leipzig.de
 Zimbio
 Getty Images

German female divers
Living people
Divers from Dresden
1995 births
Olympic divers of Germany
Divers at the 2016 Summer Olympics
World Aquatics Championships medalists in diving
Medalists at the 2020 Summer Olympics
Olympic medalists in diving
Divers at the 2020 Summer Olympics
Olympic bronze medalists for Germany
21st-century German women